Ișcălău is a commune in Făleşti District, Moldova. It is composed of three villages: Burghelea, Doltu and Ișcălău.

References

Communes of Fălești District